Maulana Muhammad Khan Sherani (Pashto/) is a Pakistani politician who had been a member of the National Assembly of Pakistan, between 1988 and May 2018. He is the leader of Jamiat Ulema-e-Islam Pakistan (JUIP).

Education
According to DAWN, Sheerani received his education at madrassas.

Political career 
He has served as Former District Nazim Zhob District.

He was elected to the National Assembly of Pakistan as a candidate of Jamiat Ulema-e Islam (F) (JUI-F) from Constituency NA-200 Zhob in 1988 Pakistani general election. He received 13,307 votes and defeated  a candidate of Jamiat Ulema-e Islam (D).
 
He was re-elected to the National Assembly as a candidate of JUI-F from Constituency NA-200 Zhob in 1990 Pakistani general election. He received 15,965 votes and defeated  Nawab Muhammad Ayaz Khan Jogezai, a candidate of Pashtunkhwa Milli Awami Party (PKMAP).

He ran for the seat of the National Assembly as a candidate of IJM from Constituency NA-200 Zhob in 1993 Pakistani general election but was unsuccessful. He received 15,260 votes and lost the seat to Nawab Muhammad Ayaz Khan Jogezai.

He was re-elected to the National Assembly as a candidate of JUI-F from Constituency NA-200 (Zhob) in 1997 Pakistani general election. He received 14,679 votes and defeated Nawab Muhammad Ayaz Khan Jogezai.

He was re-elected to the National Assembly as a candidate of Muttahida Majlis-e-Amal (MMA) from Constituency NA-264 (Zhob-cum-Killa Saifullah) in 2002 Pakistani general election. He received 20,381 votes and defeated Nawab Muhammad Ayaz Khan Jogezai.

He ran for the seat of the National Assembly as a candidate of MMA from Constituency NA-264 (Zhob-cum-Sherani-cum-Killa Saifullah) in 2008 Pakistani general election but was unsuccessful. He received 17,066 votes and lost the seat to Maulvi Asmatullah.

He was elected to the Senate of Pakistan and was made chairman of the Council of Islamic Ideology with the status of federal minister in 2010 for three years. He was again made chairman of the Council of Islamic Ideology in 2013.

He has served as Federal Minister for Religious Affairs.

He was re-elected to the National Assembly as a candidate of JUI-F from Constituency NA-264 (Zhob-cum-Sherani-cum-Killa Saifullah) in 2013 Pakistani general election. He received 30,870 votes and defeated Moulana Asmatullah, a candidate of Jamiat Ulama-e-Islam Nazryati.

Alliance with Imran Khan's PTI
On 13 June 2022, Sherani met with Imran Khan and declared an alliance with his party, the Pakistan Tehreek-e-Insaf.

Sherani also took to Twitter and said that when he asked Fazl ur-Rehman does he have proof that Imran Khan is a Jewish and Indian agent, Fazl responded with "it's just a political statement".

References

Living people
Pashtun people
Pakistani MNAs 2013–2018
People from Zhob District
Jamiat Ulema-e-Islam (F) politicians
Pakistani MNAs 2002–2007
Pakistani MNAs 1988–1990
Pakistani MNAs 1990–1993
Pakistani MNAs 1997–1999
1938 births